Tobias Ekberg (born 13 January 1994) is a professional Swedish ice hockey player. He currently plays for Leksands IF in the Swedish Hockey League. He was born in Töreboda, Sweden and represented the youth team Töreboda HF.  Ekberg previously played for Malmö Redhawks and Djurgårdens IF.

References

External links

1994 births
Living people
Djurgårdens IF Hockey players
Leksands IF players
Linköping HC players
Malmö Redhawks players
IK Oskarshamn players
IK Pantern players
People from Töreboda Municipality
Sportspeople from Västra Götaland County
Swedish ice hockey goaltenders